Workneh is an Ethiopian masculine given name. Notable people with the name include:

Workneh Eshete (1864–1952), Ethiopian medical doctor and intellectual
Workneh Gebeyehu, Ethiopian politician

The name Workneh translates to "You are gold" for a male. It translates to "Worknesh" for a female.

Masculine given names